Fredie Blom (8 May 1904? – 22 August 2020) was a South African claimed supercentenarian. He claimed to have been born on 8 May 1904, which would have made him 116 years old when he died of natural causes on 22 August 2020. While Blom had a South African identity card listing his birth date, Guinness World Records never verified the claim. He was known for regularly smoking, and was reportedly the oldest man after Violet Brown, a Jamaican, died at 117 years old on 15 September 2017.

Blom was born in Adelaide, Eastern Cape, and while he was still young moved to Cape Town. A significant part of his family died in the Spanish flu pandemic of 1918.

Blom spent most of his life working as a Black labourer in the construction sector and on a farm during the apartheid period. He initially worked as a farm worker in Cape Town before joining the construction sector. He was illiterate and never attended school during his childhood. However, he could count.

Blom worked installing 'vibracrete' walls, a type of concrete, retiring from that job after he was over 80 years old. His 116th birthday during the COVID-19 pandemic was widely covered. He married and had three children, before dying on 22 August 2020 at Tygerberg Hospital in Cape Town.

References

Notes

Sources 

2020 deaths
Longevity claims